The Landmark Diner (also referred to as "The Landmark") is a diner located in the Incorporated Village of Flower Hill, in Nassau County, on Long Island, in New York, United States. It became the first double-decker diner in the United States after being rebuilt a couple of lots to the east in 2009.

Description

Original building, 1964 - 2009 
The Landmark Diner originally opened in 1964 in a single-story building. This structure housed the Landmark until 2009, when the current building opened. This move was made for a number of reasons, including the existing dining space. Additionally, a new septic system was needed, and the original property could not accommodate the upgrades.

After the current building opened, the original lot, located at 1023 Northern Boulevard, was rebuilt as a furniture store.

Current building, 2009 - present 
The entrance features a foyer whose centerpiece is a glass elevator. There are dining rooms on both the first and second floors, and the second floor's dining areas are visible from the first floor's dining areas. The upstairs also features a central bar and a private party room.

References

External links 
Landmark Diner official website

Flower Hill, New York
Diners in New York (state)
1964 establishments in New York (state)
Restaurants in New York (state)
Restaurants established in 1964
Buildings and structures in Nassau County, New York